Colin Noel Bickley Hurt (16 December 1893 — 31 December 1972) was an English cricketer who played for Derbyshire in 1914.

Hurt was born in Darley Dale. He played three first-class matches for Derbyshire during July 1914, and, in his second match, against Lancashire, was one of the three batsmen taken in a hat-trick scored by John Bullough. Hunt was a right-handed lower-order batsman and played 5 innings in 4 first-class matches. His top score was 13 and his average 4.6. He was a right-arm medium-pace bowler and bowled 3 overs without taking a wicket.

The First World War brought a stop to the championship and Hurt joined the 6th Bn, East Lancashire Regiment. He was a 2nd Lieutenant and was wounded in August 1915.

Hurt died at Little Common, Bexhill, Sussex at the age of 79.

References

1893 births
1972 deaths
English cricketers
Derbyshire cricketers
People from Darley Dale
Cricketers from Derbyshire